A Place Called Love may refer to:

 A Place Called Love (Judy Rodman album), 1987
 A Place Called Love (Johnny Reid album), 2010